David Dixon Award is a four-yearly award given to the outstanding athlete of each Commonwealth Games, based on their performance at the event, fair play, and overall contribution to their team's participation at the Commonwealth Games.

The award was introduced in the 2002 Commonwealth Games in Manchester and is named after the former honorary secretary of the Commonwealth Games Federation for 17 years, David Dixon.

Winners

See also

References

Sports trophies and awards
Commonwealth Games
Sportsmanship trophies and awards